Nikolay Gerasimovich Kuznetsov (24 July 1904 – 6 December 1974) was a Soviet naval officer who achieved the rank of Admiral of the Fleet of the Soviet Union and served as People's Commissar of the Navy during the Second World War. The N. G. Kuznetsov Naval Academy and the Russian aircraft carrier , as well as the Kuznetsov-class carrier class, are named in his honor.

Biography

Early years and career 
Kuznetsov was born into a Serbian peasant family in the village of Medvedki, Velikoustyuzhsky Uyezd, Vologda Governorate, Russian Empire (now in Kotlassky District of Arkhangelsk Oblast, Russia).

In 1919, Kuznetsov joined the Northern Dvina Naval Flotilla, having added two years to his age to make himself eligible to serve. In 1920, he was stationed at Petrograd and in 1924, as a member of a naval unit, he attended the funeral ceremony of Vladimir Lenin.

That same year, he joined the Communist Party.

Upon graduation from the Frunze Higher Naval School in 1926, Kuznetsov served on the cruiser , first as watch officer and then as First Lieutenant. In 1932, he graduated from the Naval College after studying operational tactics. Upon graduation, he was offered two options – a desk job with the general staff or a command post on a ship.

Kuznetsov successfully applied for the post of executive officer on the cruiser . Within a year, the young officer earned his next promotion. In 1934, he returned to the Chervona Ukraina, this time as her commander. Under Kuznetsov, the ship became an outstanding example of discipline and organization, quickly drawing attention to her young captain.

From 5 September 1936 to 15 August 1937, Kuznetsov served as the Soviet naval attaché and chief naval advisor to Republican Spain. During the early stages of the Spanish Civil War of 1936-1939 he developed a strong dislike of fascism.

On returning home, on January 10, 1938, he was promoted to the rank of flag officer, 2nd rank, and given command of the Pacific Fleet. While in this position, he came face to face with Stalin's purge of the military. Kuznetsov himself was never implicated, but many of the officers under his command were. Kuznetsov resisted the purges at every step, and his intervention saved the lives of many Soviet officers.

On 28 April 1939, Kuznetsov, still only thirty-four, was appointed the People's Commissar (Minister) of the Navy, a post he would hold throughout the Second World War until 1946. In 1939, despite Stalin's negative attitude to the Nikolaevsky Engineering Academy, Nikolay Gerasimovich Kuznetsov ordered the return of the Naval Engineering faculty from Moscow to Leningrad, and set up the Military Engineering-Technical University to educate engineers for the construction of naval bases.

The Second World War
Kuznetsov played a crucial role during the first hours of the war – at this pivotal moment, his resolve and blatant disregard for orders averted the destruction of the Soviet Navy. By June 21, 1941, Kuznetzov was convinced of the inevitability of war with Nazi Germany. On the same day Semyon Timoshenko and Georgy Zhukov issued a directive prohibiting Soviet commanders from responding to "German provocations". The Navy, however, constituted a distinct ministry (narkomat), and thus Kuznetsov held a position which was technically outside the direct chain of command. He utilized this fact in a very bold move.

Shortly after midnight on the morning of June 22, Kuznetsov ordered all Soviet fleets to battle readiness. At 3:15 am that same morning, the Wehrmacht began Operation Barbarossa. The Soviet Navy was the only branch of the military in the highest state of combat readiness at the start of the initial German push.

In the following two years, Kuznetsov's primary concern was the protection of the Caucasus from a German invasion. Throughout the war, the Black Sea remained the primary theater of operations for the Soviet Navy. During the war years Kuznetsov honed Soviet methods of amphibious assault. A notable subordinate in the Black Sea and in command of the Azov Flotilla was S.G. Gorshkov who would later succeed him as Commander-in-Chief of the Navy.  In May 1944 he was given the rank of Admiral of the Fleet – a newly created position initially equated to that of a four-star general. In the same year, Kuznetsov was given the title of Hero of the Soviet Union. On May 31, 1945, his rank was equated to the rank of Marshal of the Soviet Union with a similar insignia. In August 1945, he took part in Operation August Storm in the Far East, helping to provide functions for the Soviet Navy fleet for Commander-in-Chief of USSR Forces in the Far East Marshal Aleksandr Vasilevsky.

The first fall
From 1946 to 1947 he was the Deputy Minister of the USSR Armed Forces and Commander-in-Chief of the Naval Forces.

In 1947 he was removed from his post on Stalin's orders and in 1948 he, as well as several other admirals were put on trial by the Naval Tribunal. Kuznetsov was demoted to vice-admiral, while the other admirals received prison sentences of varying length.

In 1951 Stalin ended Kuznetsov's pariah status, once again placing him in command of the Navy (as the Minister of the Navy of the USSR), but without restoring his military rank, which was returned to him upon Stalin's death in 1953. In the same year, he became the First Deputy Minister of Defense of the USSR. In 1955, Kuznetsov was made Commander-in-Chief of the Naval Forces. His rank was raised to Admiral of the Fleet of the Soviet Union and he was awarded the Marshal's Star.

The second fall and retirement
His newfound prominence brought him into direct conflict with now Defense Minister Marshal Zhukov, with whom he had clashed during the war years. On December 8, 1955, using the loss of the battleship  as a pretext, Zhukov removed the Admiral from his post. The commission that inspected the ship's loss was headed by Vyacheslav Malyshev and its findings were used by Zhukov to blame Kuznetsov. In February 1956 he was again demoted to the rank of vice-admiral, retired and expressly forbidden "any and all work connected with the navy."

During his retirement he wrote and published many essays and articles, as well as several longer works, including his memoirs and an officially sanctioned book, "With a Course for Victory", which dealt with the Patriotic War. His memoirs, unlike those of many other prominent leaders, were written by him personally and are noted for their style.

Kuznetsov also authored several books on the war, on Stalin's repressions, and on the navy which were published posthumously. In these he was highly critical of the Party's interference in the internal affairs of the military, and insisted that "the state must be ruled by law."

Rehabilitation and legacy
After the retirement of Zhukov in 1957, and of Khrushchev in 1964, a group of naval veterans began a campaign addressed to the Soviet leadership to restore Kuznetsov's rank, with all benefits, and to make him one of the General Inspectors of the Ministry of Defence. Invariably, these requests fell on deaf ears. Not until July 26, 1988, under Andrey Gromyko did the Presidium of the Supreme Soviet of the USSR reinstate Kuznetsov to his former rank of Admiral of the Fleet of the Soviet Union. Kuznetsov is now recognized as one of the most prominent men in the history of the Soviet and, today, of the Russian Navy. In token of this recognition, the Russian Navy's largest surface warship and service flagship, its only aircraft carrier, is named in his honor.

Death
Kuznetsov died on 6 December, 1974 in Moscow, at aged 70 and was buried with full military honors at the Novodevichy Cemetery.

Dates of rank
Personal ranks for the Russian Navy were abolished in 1918, and were only restored in 1935, excepting the various ranks of admiral which were not restored until 1940.

Enlisted seaman (1919–1922)
Naval cadet, M.V. Frunze Higher Naval School (1923)
Graduated with honours
Appointed assistant ship commander 4th rank (Junior Lieutenant/Ensign) (5 October 1926)
Successively senior assistant ship commander (Executive Officer) 3rd rank (Senior Lieutenant/sub-lieutenant)senior assistant ship commander 2nd rank (Captain-Lieutenant/Lieutenant)ship commander 2nd rank (Captain 3rd rank/Lieutenant-Commander) (1926–1929)
Senior Assistant Ship Commander (Executive Officer) 1st Rank (Captain 2nd rank/Commander) (1932)
Captain 1st Rank (Captain) (August 1937)
Flag Officer 2nd Rank (2 February 1938)
Fleet Flag Officer 2nd Rank (3 April 1939)
Admiral (4 June 1940)
Admiral of the Fleet (31 May 1944)
Admiral of the fleet equated to Marshal of the Soviet Union (25 May 1945)
Rear Admiral (10 February 1948)
Vice-Admiral (27 January 1951)
Admiral of the Fleet (13 May 1953)
Admiral of the Fleet of the Soviet Union (3 March 1955)
Vice-Admiral (demoted) (17 February 1956)
Admiral of the Fleet of the Soviet Union (restored posthumously) (26 July 1988)

Honours and awards
Soviet Union

 Marshal's Star (1955)
 Honorary weapon – sword inscribed with national emblem of the Soviet Union (1932)

Foreign

Quotes
"My whole life has been the Soviet Navy. I made my choice when young and have never regretted it."

See also

 Marko Voinovich
 Marko Ivelich
 Matija Zmajević
 Nikolai Dimitrievich Dabić

References

Kuznetsov, Admiral  Memoirs of the Wartime Minister of the Navy Moscow Progress Publishers 1990

External links
Information page, including memoirs
Colour photo and biography from site of ETS Publishing House 

1904 births
1974 deaths
People from Kotlassky District
People from Velikoustyuzhsky Uyezd
People from the Russian Empire of Serbian descent
Soviet people of Serbian descent
Russian people of Serbian descent
Bolsheviks
Central Committee of the Communist Party of the Soviet Union members
Soviet Ministers of Defence
Second convocation members of the Soviet of the Union
Fourth convocation members of the Soviet of Nationalities
Soviet naval attachés
Soviet admirals
Admirals of the Fleet of the Soviet Union
N. G. Kuznetsov Naval Academy alumni
Soviet people of the Spanish Civil War
Russian people of the Spanish Civil War
Soviet military personnel of World War II
Heroes of the Soviet Union
Recipients of the Order of Lenin
Recipients of the Order of Ushakov, 1st class
Recipients of the Order of the Red Banner
Recipients of the Marshal's Star
Commanders of the Order of Polonia Restituta
Recipients of the Order of Polonia Restituta (1944–1989)
Recipients of the Order of the Cross of Grunwald
Admirals of World War II